Faculdade Cásper Líbero (FCL) is a private college in São Paulo, Brazil. Founded in 1947 by Brazilian journalist Cásper Líbero, it is the oldest journalism school in Latin America. The university offers courses on journalism, broadcasting, advertising and public relations. 

Faculdade Cásper Líbero is a leading communications school in Brazil. It ranked as the best private communications school in the country on Folha de S. Paulo's University Ranking.

History
Faculdade Cásper Líbero was founded in 1947 by Brazilian journalist Cásper Líbero. In 1972, it introduced courses on advertising and public relations. In 2002, it introduced a broadcasting course. The university is located at 900 Paulista Avenue.

Admissions 
All students are admitted through a competitive entrance exam, usually consisting of 90 multiple-choice questions and a written essay. Students may also earn extra points depending on their performance on the ENEM exam.

Professors 

 José Geraldo Vieira

Alumni 

Bianca Santana
 Cesar Tralli
 Clóvis Rossi
 Clóvis de Barros Filho
 Gilberto Dimenstein
 Gugu Liberato
 Maria Julia Coutinho
 Mari Palma
 Mônica Bergamo

See also
Fundação Cásper Líbero

References

External links
Official website

Educational institutions established in 1947
Journalism schools in South America
Universities and colleges in São Paulo (state)
1947 establishments in Brazil
Private universities and colleges in Brazil
Brazilian journalism organisations